Saphenista chloromixta is a species of moth of the family Tortricidae. It is found in Costa Rica.

References

Moths described in 1992
Saphenista